Indianapolis Hoosiers was the name of three major league and at least three minor league baseball clubs based in Indianapolis.

 Indianapolis Hoosiers (American Association), which played in 1884
 Indianapolis Hoosiers (National League), which played from 1887 until 1889
 Indianapolis Hoosiers (Federal League), which played in 1914 and then became the Newark Peppers
 Indianapolis Hoosiers (minor league baseball), which played in the Western League before 1900, in the non-major American League during 1900, and in the Western Association in 1901

See also
 Indiana Hoosiers, athletic teams representing Indiana University